Eric Arthur Frederic Worrell (MBE), (27 October 1924 – 13 July 1987) was an Australian naturalist, herpetologist, science writer and zoo founder and director, known for establishing the Australian Reptile Park at Wyoming on the NSW Central Coast in 1959. 

Worrells collection of snake venom was utilised by the Australian Serum Laboratories as essential in the production of snake anti-venom in Australia.

History
Eric was born at Granville, New South Wales the son of salesman and taxidriver (Charles) Percy Frederic Worrell and his wife Rita Mary Ann Worrell (née Rochester). Eric was educated at Glenmore Road Public School in Paddington then Sydney Boys High School. By the age of 10 he was keenly interested in wildlife, keeping reptiles and other animals at home (first at Paddington then around 1938, to Cecily Street, Lilyfield). He was encouraged in his hobby by his parents and by George Cann, the "Snake Man of La Perouse", and latterly Keeper of Reptiles at Taronga Park Zoo.

He left school at 13 and spent several years in work gangs in regional New South Wales and Queensland, studying drawing and photography in his spare time. During the Second World War he worked as a civilian blacksmith on the installation of shore artillery in Darwin and other work at Katherine, where he had many opportunities to study the local wildlife. After the war he and his friend, the poet Roland Robinson returned to the Northern Territory in 1946, collecting specimens for zoos and museums, and writing articles on Territory wildlife for magazines such as Walkabout.

In 1950, Worrell opened the Ocean Beach Aquarium at Umina Beach on the New South Wales Central Coast. It was here in 1951 that he first started supplying tiger snake venom to the Commonwealth Serum Laboratories (CSL) in Melbourne. Taipan venom followed in 1952. He later expanded his repertoire to include spiders such as the Sydney funnel-web spider and exotic snakes. In 1955 CSL provided Worrell, together with Ken Slater and Ram Chandra with some of the first doses of Taipan antivenom, in recognition of the dangers involved in their work.

In 1958, he purchased land at Wyoming, New South Wales, establishing the Australian Reptile Park, which opened in October 1959, with a large number of exotic as well as Australian animals. In 1963 he had a giant dinosaur statue erected at its entrance as a tourist drawcard, one of Australia's first "Big Things".

In 1985, beset with personal, health and financial problems, he tried to sell the Reptile Park, but was bailed out with financial assistance from entertainer Bobby Limb and local businessman Ed Manners.

He died of a heart attack at his home in the Reptile Park and was cremated.

In 1996, after Worrell's death, the Park was moved to Somersby.

Personal
Worrell married Carol Renee Hawkins, a shop assistant, on 31 July 1948 and had three children. They divorced in 1971.

He married his secretary Robyn Beverley Innes on 16 June 1973. They divorced in 1985.

Among his friends were the naturalist Vincent Serventy, zoologist Jock Marshall, photographer Jeff Carter and artist Russell Drysdale.

Recognition
A 1964 sketch portrait of Worrell, "The Snake Man" by Russell Drysdale, is held by the National Gallery of Australia
In 1970 Worrell received an MBE in recognition of his lifesaving role in the development of snake anti-venoms. In the same year the ARP began supplying funnel-web spider venom to the CSL in the process of developing an anti-venom.
He and Robyn received the National Australia Bank's humanitarian award for their contribution to the development of an antivenene for the Sydney funnel-web spider in 1981.
Snake Bitten, a book about Worrell, was published in 2010.

Bibliography
Apart from numerous scientific papers and popular natural history articles in Walkabout, Wildlife, Australian Outdoors, Pix and People Magazine, books authored, coauthored or contributed to by Worrell include:
 1952 – Dangerous Snakes of Australia  (Angus and Robertson). (2nd edition 1953; 3rd edition, 1957. (Some or all of these editions are undated but Worrell states that the 1st edition was published in 1952 in the first printing of Dangerous Snakes of Australia and New Guinea; see next entry)).
 1961 – Dangerous Snakes of Australia and New Guinea. (Angus and Robertson). (Described by Worrell as the 4th edition; 5th edition,1963, reprinted 1966; 6th edition, 1969).
 1958 – Song of the Snake. (Angus and Robertson)
 1962 – Australian Reptile Park (A.R.P.). (Angus and Robertson)
 1964 – Reptiles of Australia. (Angus and Robertson)
 1966 – Australian Wildlife. (Angus and Robertson)
 1966 – Australian Snakes, Crocodiles and Tortoises. (Angus and Robertson)
 1966 – The Great Barrier Reef. (Angus and Robertson)
 1966 – The Great Extermination. (part author) – (Heinemenn) by Alan Moorhead
 1967 – Trees of the Australian Bush. (co-author with Lois Sourry) (Angus and Robertson)
 1968 – Making Friends with Animals. (Angus and Robertson)
 1970 – Australian Birds and Animals. (Angus and Robertson)
 1977 – Things that Sting. (Angus and Robertson)

References

External links
 Australian Reptile Park

1924 births
1987 deaths
Australian herpetologists
Australian nature writers
20th-century Australian zoologists
People educated at Sydney Boys High School